Yossi Matias is an Israeli computer scientist, entrepreneur and Google executive.

Matias is Vice President, Engineering at Google, Search & AI, and the global lead of its Crisis Response efforts. He is also the founding managing director of Google's Center in Israel and co-lead of Google's AI for Social Good.
He is a recipient of Gödel Prize, an ACM Fellow and a recipient of Paris Kanellakis Theory and Practice Award for seminal work on the foundations of streaming algorithms and their application to large scale data analytics.

Matias established the Research and Development Center of Google in Israel. He led the development of Google products such as Google Trends, Google Insights for Search, Google Suggest, Google Visualization API, Ephemeral IDs for IoT. 
He is leading efforts in Conversational AI including Google Duplex, 
Call Screen, Live Caption, Live Relay, Recorder, and Euphonia.

He pioneered an initiative to bring cultural and heritage collections online, such as the Yad Vashem Holocaust Memorial Museum archive, the Dead Sea Scrolls., and the Nelson Mandela Archive, which along with Google Art Project seeded up Google Cultural Institute. 
He is leading a global initiative for Crisis Response and Flood Forecasting.

Matias is the executive lead and founder of Google's Campus Tel Aviv, a technology hub for promoting innovation and entrepreneurship and birthplace of programs such as Campus for Moms and LaunchPad, which has evolved into Launchpad Accelerator, and LaunchPad Studio for AI & ML focused startups. 

Prof. Matias is on the computer science faculty at Tel Aviv University, and previously a research scientist at Bell Labs and a visiting professor at Stanford. He published extensively in the areas of data analysis, algorithms for massive data sets, data streams and synopses, parallel algorithms and systems, data compression, data and information management systems, security and privacy, video processing, and Internet technologies. He is the inventor of over 60 patents.

Matias pioneered some of the early technologies for the effective analysis of big data, internet privacy and contextual search.

References

External links

 Fastcompany.com
 Sites.google.com
 Sites.google.com - Biography

Year of birth missing (living people)
Living people
Israeli computer scientists
American computer scientists
Theoretical computer scientists
Academic staff of Tel Aviv University
Database researchers
Google employees
Fellows of the Association for Computing Machinery
Gödel Prize laureates